John Raymond McGann (December 2, 1924 – January 29, 2002) was an American prelate of the Catholic Church. He served as bishop of the Diocese of Rockville Centre, in New York from 1976 to 2000.  He previously served as an auxiliary bishop of the same diocese from 1970 to 1976.

Biography

Early life and education
John McGann was born on December 2, 1924, in Brooklyn, New York, to Thomas and Mary (née Ryan) McGann. His twin sister, who took the name Sr. John Raymond McGann joined the Sisters of Saint Joseph in Brentwood, Long Island, becoming general superior of the congregation in 1978. A second sibling, Sr. Thomas Joseph, also joined the Sisters of Saint Joseph.

He received his early education at the parochial school of Our Lady of Good Counsel Church, graduating in 1938. He then began his studies for the priesthood at Cathedral College in Brooklyn, and afterwards attended Immaculate Conception Seminary in Huntington, New York, from 1944 to 1950.

Ordination and ministry
On June 3, 1950, McGann was ordained a priest for the Diocese of Brooklyn by Bishop Thomas E. Molloy. His first assignment was as a curate at St. Anne's Parish in Brentwood, New York, where he served for seven years. He also served as an assistant chaplain at Pilgrim State Hospital and a professor at St. Joseph's Academy, both in Brentwood (1950–1954).

In 1957, McGann was named assistant personal secretary to Bishop Walter P. Kellenberg and assistant chancellor of the newly erected Diocese of Rockville Centre. He became personal secretary to Bishop Kellenberg in 1959, and was named a papal chamberlain by Pope John XXIII that same year. In addition to his pastoral work at St. Agnes Cathedral, he was made vice-chancellor of the diocese in 1967 and served as secretary of the diocesan board of consultors.

Auxiliary Bishop and Bishop of Rockville Centre
On November 12, 1970, McGann was appointed auxiliary bishop of Rockville Centre and titular bishop of Morosbisdus by Pope Paul VI. He received his episcopal consecration on January 7, 1971, from Bishop Kellenberg, with Bishops Vincent Baldwin and Charles Mulrooney serving as co-consecrators. On May 3, 1976, McGann was appointed bishop of Rockville Centre by Paul VI. He was elected treasurer of the National Conference of Catholic Bishops in 1984.

Retirement and death
Pope John Paul II accepted McGann's resignation as bishop of the Diocese of Rockville Centre on January 4, 2000. He was succeeded by Bishop James T. McHugh, who had served as his coadjutor bishop since 1999. John McGann died at Mercy Medical Center in Rockville Centre on January 31, 2002, at age 77.

The Radiology & Imaging Center at Mercy Medical Center is named for Bishop McGann, as is Bishop McGann-Mercy High School. Bishop John R. McGann Village is a senior low income housing apartment in Bay Shore, New York.

Two unnamed women alleged in 2019 through an attorney that McGann and other clergy and personnel of the diocese sexually abused them as children in the 1960s and '70s.

See also

 Catholic Church in the United States
 Historical list of the Catholic bishops of the United States
 List of the Catholic bishops of the United States
 Lists of patriarchs, archbishops, and bishops

References

External links 
The Roman Catholic Diocese of Rockville Centre

1924 births
2002 deaths
American Roman Catholic clergy of Irish descent
People from Brooklyn
People from Brentwood, New York
Catholics from New York (state)
20th-century Roman Catholic bishops in the United States
Burials at the Cemetery of the Holy Rood